The following is a list of notable deaths in April 1992.

Entries for each day are listed alphabetically by surname. A typical entry lists information in the following sequence:
 Name, age, country of citizenship at birth, subsequent country of citizenship (if applicable), reason for notability, cause of death (if known), and reference.

April 1992

1
Robert Edward Bell, 73, Canadian nuclear physicist and academic.
Carl E. Duckett, 69, American intelligence operative, lung cancer.
Michael Havers, Baron Havers, 69, British barrister and politician.
Seymour Mamedov, 20, Azerbaijani soldier, killed in battle.
Nigel Preston, 28, English drummer, drug overdose.
Walter Andreas Schwarz, 78, German singer.
Konstantin Sergeyev, 82, Russian danseur, artistic director and choreographer.
Edward Smouha, 82, British track and field athlete and Olympic medalist.

2
Nugzar Asatiani, 54, Soviet Olympic fencer (1964).
Juanito, 37, Spanish footballer, traffic collision.
Hjalmar Karlsson, 86, Swedish sailor.
Paula Kelly, 72, American singer.
Gabriel Tiacoh, 29, Ivorian sprinter and  Olympic medalist, meningitis.
Tomisaburō Wakayama, 62, Japanese actor (Lone Wolf and Cub), heart failure.
Dib Williams, 82, American baseball player.

3
Aaron Bohrod, 84, American painter, liver cancer.
Nie Fengzhi, 79, Chinese Army Lieutenant general.
Juan García Hortelano, 64, Spanish writer, poet and literary critic, lung cancer.
Ivan Rukavina, 80, Yugoslav Army general and politician.
Karl Tunberg, 85, American screenwriter (Ben-Hur).

4
Vincenzo Bertolotto, 79, Italian rugby player.
Albrecht Fleckenstein, 74, German pharmacologist and physiologist.
Vintilă Horia, 76, Romanian writer.
Salgueiro Maia, 47, Portuguese Army officer, cancer.
Rixi Markus, 81, Austrian-British contract bridge player.
Samuel Reshevsky, 80, Polish-American chess player.
Arthur Russell, 40, American musician, AIDS.

5
Daniel Campbell, 66, Canadian politician.
Takeshi Inoue, 63, Japanese footballer.
Molly Picon, 94, American actress (Fiddler on the Roof, The Cannonball Run, Car 54, Where Are You?), Alzheimer's disease.
Modjeska Monteith Simkins, 92, American social rights  and civil rights activist.
Sam Walton, 74, American businessman, founder of Walmart, multiple myeloma.

6
Isaac Asimov, 72, Russian-American science fiction author (Foundation, Galactic Empire, Robot), heart failure.
Patrick Desmond Callaghan, 65, Pakistani air officer.
Edith Katherine Cash, 101, American mycologist and lichenologist.
Vakhtang Chabukiani, 82, Soviet ballet dancer.
Donald Harding, 43, American murderer, execution by gas chamber.
Peter Hayman, 77, British diplomat and intelligence operative.
Herman Francis Mark, 96, Austrian-American chemist.
Edward S. Montgomery, 81, American journalist, pneumonia.
Jim Pomeroy, 47, American artist.
Erling Wikborg, 97, Norwegian politician.

7
Ace Bailey, 88, Canadian ice hockey player.
Horst Niemack, 83, German general during World War II.
Clovis Ruffin, 46, American fashion designer, complication from AIDS.
Alix Talton, 71, American actress, lung cancer.
Antonis Tritsis, 55, Greek politician and urban planner.
Frank Walsh, 89, American golfer.

8
Daniel Bovet, 85, Swiss-born Italian pharmacologist, Nobel Prize recipient (1957), cancer.
John Cherberg, 81, American football coach and politician.
Ronald Eyre, 62, English theatre director.
Käte Hamburger, 95, Germanist, literary scholar and philosopher.
Nelson Olmsted, 78, American actor.
Gilbert de Beauregard Robinson, 85, Canadian mathematician.
Sam Rosen, 70, American comic book artist and letterer (Spider-Man, Captain America, X-Men).

9
Charles Ginsburg, 71, American engineer and inventor of the videotape recorder, pneumonia.
John Kissell, 68, American gridiron football player.
Ivan Lund, 62, Australian fencer.
Gale W. McGee, 77, American politician, member of the U.S. Senate (1959–1977).
Theodor Schieffer, 81, German historian.
Alfred Szklarski, 80, Polish author.
Erik Werba, 73, Austrian classical pianist.

10
Charles Mitchill Bogert, 83, American herpetologist and museum curator.
Hermann Eppenhoff, 72, German football player and manager.
Şahlar Hüseynov, 23, Azerbaijani soldier and war hero, killed in action .
János Kajdi, 52, Hungarian boxer and Olympian, traffic collision.
Sam Kinison, 38, American comedian and actor (Back to School), traffic collision.
Cec Linder, 71, Polish-Canadian actor (Goldfinger, Quatermass and the Pit, Lolita), pulmonary emphysema.
Peter D. Mitchell, 71, English biochemist, Nobel Prize recipient (1978).
William Paling, 99, British politician.

11
James Brown, 72, American actor (The Adventures of Rin Tin Tin), lung cancer.
Adele Dixon, 83, English actress and singer, pneumonia.
Heinrich Lausberg, 79, German linguist.
Frank Maher, 73, American gridiron football player.
Eve Merriam, 75, American poet, liver cancer.
Fakhraddin Musayev, 34, Azerbaijani soldier, killed in battle.
Alejandro Obregón, 71, Colombian artist.
Gerard Tichy, 72, German-Spanish actor.
Josip Vidmar, 96, Slovenian literary critic, essayist, and politician.

12
Ilario Bandini, 80, Italian racing driver and racing car manufacturer.
Makineni Basavapunnaiah, 77, Indian politician.
Ettore Gracis, 76, Italian conductor.
Georg Haentzschel, 84, German pianist, broadcaster, composer and arranger.
Gunter Jahn, 81, German U-boat commander during Worls War II.
Deane Keller, 90, American artist and academic.
Jean Émile Reymond, 79, Monacan politician.
Robert L. Wheeler, 71, American trainer of thoroughbred racehorses.

13
John Bruno, 27, American gridiron football player, skin cancer.
Charles Patrick Fitzgerald, 90, British historian and writer.
Eddie Fontaine, 65, American actor and singer, esophageal cancer.
Feza Gürsey, 71, Turkish physicist, prostate cancer.
Brian Oulton, 84, English actor.
Daniel Pollock, 23, Australian film actor (Romper Stomper), suicide.
Ray Roberts, 79, American politician.
Maurice Sauvé, 68, Canadian politician.
Firudin Shamoyev, 30, Azerbaijani soldier and war hero, killed in action
Stuart Surridge, 74, English cricketer.
Martin T. Williams, 67, American music critic and writer.
 Peter Joseph Fan Xueyan, 85, Chinese Roman Catholic priest

14
David Miller, 82, American film director, cancer.
Artur Mkrtchyan, 33, Nagorno-Karabakh politician, shot.
Marshall D. Moran, 85,  American Jesuit priest and missionary .
Valeh Muslumov, 23, Azerbaijan soldier and war hero, killed in action.
Sammy Price, 83, American pianist, heart attack.

15
Otis Barton, 92, American deep-sea diver, inventor and actor.
David Bosch, 62, South African missiologist and theologian, traffic collision.
William Bridges-Maxwell, 62, Australian politician.
Howard Sylvester Ellis, 93, American economist.
Hans Maass, 80, German mathematician.
Frank Richards, 82, American actor.
Aleksandr Sevidov, 70, Soviet football coach and player, cancer.
James Zumberge, 68, American geologist and academic.

16
Gilbert Alsop, 83, English footballer.
Neville Brand, 71, American actor, emphysema.
James Gallagher, 82, American soccer player.
Andy Russell, 72, American singer, complications from a stroke.
Bhalindra Singh, 72, Indian cricket player.

17
Maurice Buckmaster, 90, British Special Operations Executive operative.
Arthur Calder-Marshall, 83, English novelist, essayist, and biographer.
Arkady Chernyshev, 78, Soviet ice hockey, soccer and bandy player.
John DeVries, 76, American lyricist, interior designer and illustrator, complications after surgery.
Skeets Herfurt, 80, American jazz musician.
Hank Penny, 73, American musician.

18
H. V. Kershaw, 73, British television scriptwriter and producer.
Russinho, 89, Brazilian football player.
Pat Thomson, 51, English-Australian actress, aneurysm.
John Thorp, 79, American aeronautical engineer.
Paul Zaeske, 46, American gridiron football player.

19
Pierre Descamps, 75, Belgian politician.
Frankie Howerd, 75, English actor and comedian, heart failure.
Batia Lishansky, 92, Russian-Israeli sculptor.
C. C. Too, 72, Malaysian diplomat.

20
Marcel Albers, 24, Dutch racing driver, racing accident.
Marjorie Gestring, 69, American Olympic diver (1936).
Orval Grove, 72, American baseball player.
Benny Hill, 68, English comedian and actor (The Benny Hill Show), coronary thrombosis.
Jimmy Lennon, 79, American boxing and professional wrestling announcer.
Peter Murray, 72, British art historian and academic.
Johnny Shines, 76, American musician, stroke.
Llewellyn Thomas, 88, British physicist and mathematician.
Gian Carlo Wick, 82, Italian theoretical physicist.

21
Mel Branch, 55, American gridiron football player.
Louis Diercxsens, 93, Belgian field hockey player.
Gerald Feinberg, 58, American physicist.
Robert Alton Harris, 39, American convicted murderer, execution by gas chamber.
Väinö Linna, 71, Finnish author, cancer.
Grand Duke Vladimir Kirillovich of Russia, 74, Russian monarch and head of the Imperial Family.
Ioan Totu, 60, Romanian politician.
Nigel Williams, 47, English conservator, heart attack.
Ernest Yust, 64, Soviet-Hungarian footballer and coach.

22
Steffi Duna, 82, Hungarian-American film actress.
Pat Hills, 74, Australian politician.
Kang Keqing, 80, Chinese politician.
Harsono Tjokroaminoto, 79, Indonesian political figure.

23
Tanka Prasad Acharya, 80, Nepali politician, prime minister (1956–1957), kidney disease.
Ronnie Bucknum, 56, American race car driver, diabetes.
Deron Johnson, 53, American baseball player, cancer.
Hilda Kuper, 80, Rhodesian social anthropologist and writer.
Satyajit Ray, 70, Indian filmmaker, heart failure.
Omar Shendi, 76-77, Egyptian footballer.
Michael Wagner, 44, American television writer and producer (Hill Street Blues, Star Trek: The Next Generation, Capitol Critters), brain cancer.
Bror Östman, 63, Swedish ski jumper and Olympian.

24
Valdemārs Baumanis, 87, Latvian basketball player.
Elio Chacón, 55, American baseball player.
Samuel L. Greenberg, 93, American politician.
Milton Rosenstock, 74, American conductor, composer, and arranger.

25
Ernesto Balducci, 69, Italian Catholic priest and peace activist, traffic collision.
Bob Hazle, 61, American baseball player.
Brian MacLeod, 39, Canadian musician, brain cancer.
George Mantello, 90, Hungarian diplomat and anti-fascist.
Alfonso Flórez Ortiz, 39, Colombian racing cyclist, murdered.
Yutaka Ozaki, 26, Japanese musician, pulmonary edema.
Lin Richards, 83, Australian politician.
Danny Tuijnman, 77, Dutch politician.

26
Livio Abramo, 88, Brazilian-Paraguayan visual artist.
Julian Amyes, 74, British film director and producer.
Jack Dunphy, 77, American novelist and playwright.
Edgar Lewis, 90, Australian politician.
Alberta Vaughn, 87, American actress, cancer.

27
Sol K. Bright Sr., 82-83, American musician.
Harlond Clift, 79, American baseball player
Olivier Messiaen, 83, French composer and ornithologist.
Gerard K. O'Neill, 65, American physicist and space activist, leukemia.
Jack Pritchard, 93, British entrepreneur.
James Maude Richards, 84, British architectural writer.

28
Hasan as-Senussi, 63-64, Libyan crown prince, head of the Libyan royal family (since 1969).
Francis Bacon, 82, Irish-British painter, heart attack.
Andria Balanchivadze, 85, Georgian composer.
Émile Carrara, 67, French road and track cyclist.
V. K. Gokak, 82, Indian Kannada writer and scholar.
Parashkev Hadjiev, 80, Bulgarian composer.
Allan Highet, 78, New Zealand politician.
Elfed Davies, Baron Davies of Penrhys, 78, Welsh politician.
Brian Pockar, 32, Canadian figure skater, AIDS-related complications.

29
Mae Clarke, 81, American actress (Frankenstein, The Public Enemy), cancer.
Chandrabati Devi, 82, Indian actress.
Ghulam Faruque, 92, Pakistani industrialist and politician.
Stephen Oliver, 42, English composer, AIDS-related complications.

30
Agha, 78, Indian film actor , cardiovascular disease.
Preston Bassett, 100, American aerospace engineer.
Otto Bräutigam, 96, German diplomat and lawyer.
Ramiz Ganbarov, 29, Azerbaijani officer and war hero, killed in action.
Toivo Kärki, 76, Finnish composer, musician, and music producer.
Katsuo Osugi, 47, Japanese baseball player.
Iceberg Slim, 73, American novelist and pimp, liver failure.

References 

1992-04
 04